Prince Władysław Leon Adam Feliks Sapieha (30 May 1853 – 29 April 1920) was a Polish prince (Kniaź) and magnate, member of the Sapieha family (Kodeński line), landowner, social activist, deputy to the Diet of Galicia and Reichsrat.

Władysław Leon was the oldest son of Prince Adam Stanisław Sapieha and Princess Jadwiga Klementyna Sanguszko. He had two sisters and four brothers, among them cardinal Prince Adam Stefan Sapieha. From 1864 to 1871, Leon attended gymnasium, then studied law in Berlin and later in Heidelberg, and graduated in Lviv in 1876. After graduating, he spent one year serving in army. In 1877, he took a position as a clerk but resigned from the job after his brother Leon Paweł persuaded him to manage the family estate in Krasiczyn. In 1883, he was elected deputy to the Diet of Galicia where he was member of the "Center" Parliamentary group along with Prince Jerzy Konstanty Czartoryski. As a deputy, he was a member of the parliamentary commissions of budget, mining, lustration and taxes. He did not apply for re-election in 1889. In 1883, he became a member of the Economic Society of Galicia. In 1908, he was again elected to the Diet of Galicia. In 1910, he donated archives collected in Krasiczyn to Ossolineum. In 1915, he became a member of the life-saving committee for war-stricken people, established by his brother Prince Adam Stefan Sapieha. He also contributed to running the Agricultural Academy in Dublany. From 1907 he was a member of the House of Lords of Austria-Hungary.

On 30 July 1881, in Cracow, he married Countess Elżbieta Konstancja Potulicka, daughter of Count Kazimierz Wojciech Potulicki and Countess Maria Zamoyska. Władysław Leon and Elżbieta Konstancja had ten children:
 Kazimierz Leon Sapieha (1882–1906)
 Leon Aleksander Sapieha (1883–1944) - he married Katarzyna Iza Potocka
 Józef Adam Sapieha (1887–1940)
 Aleksander Józefat Sapieha (1888–1980) - he married firstly Elizabeth Hamilton-Paine and secondly Countess Maria Annunciata von Oppersdorff
 Adam Zygmunt Sapieha (1892–1970)
 Władysław Sapieha (1893–1956) - he married Ida Bornemisza de Kászon, who was sister-in-law of Heinrich, Baron Thyssen-Bornemisza de Kászon
 Andrzej Józef Sapieha (1894–1944)
 Stanisław Sapieha (1896–1919)
 Anna Sapieha (1901–1965) - she married Count Roman Juliusz Bielski
 Teresa Sapieha (1905–1995) - she married Prince Bogdan Marian Drucki-Lubecki

Władysław Leon died on 29 April 1920 in Lviv and was buried in Krasiczyn. He is great-great-grandfather of Queen Mathilde of the Belgians.

Ancestry

References

Sources
 Władysław Leon Sapieha at thePeerage.com
 Władysław Leon Sapieha at genealog.home.pl
 Polski słownik biograficzny, Volume 35
 S. Kieniewicz, Adam Sapieha: (1828–1903), Zakład Narodowy im. Ossolińskich, 1939
 K. Krzeczunowicz, Leon Sapieha, 1883-1944, 1967
 E. Sapieha, Dom Sapieżyński, Wydawnictwo Naukowe PWN, 1995
 T. Zielińska, Poczet polskich rodów arystokratycznych, Volume 1, Wydawnictwo Szkolne i Pedagogiczne, 1997

1853 births
1920 deaths
Wladyslaw Leon Sapieha
Ruthenian nobility
Politicians from Lviv